Akbarpur Degree College is a degree college in Kanpur Dehat district, Uttar Pradesh, India. The college is affiliated with CSJM University Kanpur. This college is located at Akbarpur-Mati Road near sub division Akbarpur campus and at a distance 300m from Golden Quadrilateral National Highway of India.

Faculties
Arts :Classes start on 1 July 1989 of B.A.Part (1).The college enlisted in government aid list wef 3 October 1994. Master's Degree classes start from session 2010-2011 in Hindi and Sociology subjects. 
Science :Bachelor's Degree classes starts from 1998 (self finance)
Education 
B.Ed :Recognition in 2003-2004 and government aid listed in 2014.
BTC :Recognition came in effect from session 2012-2013 (self finance)

Facilities
This college has a playground, library, reading room, canteen, cycle stand, laboratories for science students (Physics, Chemistry, Biology) and an assembly hall where all the cultural programs are organized. There are about 20,000 books in school library. Laboratories of computer science, psychology and language learning are available in B.Ed faculty.

List of principals
Chandra Prakash Pathak (Off.) (1989 - 1997)
Hans Raj Tripathi  ( Oct.1997 - March 1999)
Chandra Prakash Pathak (Off.) (April 1999 - Aug. 2004 )
Usha Kiran Agnihotri  (Off.)  (Sep. 2004 - June 2013)
Ram Krishna Chaturvedi (Off.) (July 2013 -Sept. 2018)
Chandra Prakash Pathak (off.) (Oct.2018 - June 2019)
Anju Shukla (off.) (July 2019 - Oct.2021) 
Akhilesh Chandra Pandey (26 Oct. 2021 to present)

National seminars
National seminars have been arranged here mostly in Hindi, Sanskrit, on Political Science, Economics, etc.

References

External links
 Official website

Universities and colleges in Uttar Pradesh
Education in Kanpur Dehat district
Colleges affiliated to Chhatrapati Shahu Ji Maharaj University
Educational institutions established in 1989
1989 establishments in Uttar Pradesh